Macleod railway station is located on the Hurstbridge line in Victoria, Australia. It serves the north-eastern Melbourne suburb of Macleod, and it opened on 1 March 1911.

History

Macleod station was completed by November 1910, and was opened to traffic on 1 March 1911.

The station is named after Malcolm Macleod, who acquired land in the area in 1903. When the State Government acquired land from Macleod in 1910, to build a branch line for the Mont Park Psychiatric Hospital, he stipulated that a railway station be built in his name in return. From 1911 to 1964, Macleod was the junction of the short, freight only Mont Park branch line.

In 1979, the present day Platform 3 was provided on the alignment of the former branch line, as were three stabling sidings immediately to the south of the station, both coinciding with the duplication of the railway line between Macleod and Greensborough. A number of train services terminate at Macleod, before proceeding to the sidings to stable.

In 2001, Macleod was upgraded to a Premium Station.

On 25 October 2022, the Level Crossing Removal Project announced that the Ruthven Street level crossing, located nearby in the Up direction of the station, will be grade separated by 2027, with the railway line rebuilt over the road.

Facilities, platforms and services

Macleod has one island platform with two faces, and one side platform. Platform 1 has an enclosed waiting area, ticket facilities, and toilets.

It is serviced by Metro Trains' Hurstbridge line services.

Platform 1:
  all stations and limited express services to Flinders Street

Platform 2:
  all stations services to Greensborough, Eltham and Hurstbridge

Platform 3:
  terminating services to and from Flinders Street

Transport links

Dysons operates one route via Macleod station, under contract to Public Transport Victoria:
 : Macleod – Pascoe Vale station

References

External links
 Melway map

Premium Melbourne railway stations
Railway stations in Melbourne
Railway stations in Australia opened in 1911
Railway stations in the City of Banyule